Baba Keenaram Sthal or Baba Keenaram Sthal-Kreem Kund is a spiritual centre, headquarters, and pilgrimage site of the Aghori sect of Shaivism. It is located in Ravindrapuri, Varanasi, a district of Uttar Pradesh, India. The temple is dedicated to Baba Keenaram, the originator of the Aghori sect of Shaivism.

See also
 List of Hindu temples in Varanasi
 Nepali Mandir
 Tulsi Manas Mandir
 Bharat Mata Mandir

External Websites
https://aghorpeeth.org/

References

Hindu temples in Varanasi